Ana Guardia (born 12 November 1990) is a Panamanian footballer who plays as a defender. She has been a member of the Panama women's national team.

Club career
Guardia has played for SD Atlético Nacional in Panama.

International career
Guardia capped for Panama at senior level during the 2013 Central American Games.

See also
 List of Panama women's international footballers

References

1990 births
Living people
Panamanian women's footballers
Women's association football defenders
Panama women's international footballers